Kim So-hyang (born April 5, 1978), known mononymously as Sohyang, is a South Korean singer-songwriter who has been dubbed by the international media as the "Korean Mariah Carey". According to Sohyang, her goal is to use her voice to comfort people who are going through difficult times. Sohyang is also an author of fiction, who has published multiple fantasy novels since 2013, the most well-known of them being Crystal Castle and Anaxion.

Life and career

Career 

Sohyang made her debut in 1996 with the song "Mr."(선생님). She was practicing in a recording studio and composer Jo Hwan-gon heard her singing and asked her to record a song with him. After being tested by him, Sohyang released her first single and then went on a tour with Jo Hwan-gon and participated in many concerts and musical performances. She joined her husband's family band "POS" and released several CCM albums. Sohyang became one of the most popular and influencing CCM singers of Korea. She held concerts in around 50 countries until now. In 2014, she became the first non-US-American artist to sing the American national anthem at an NBA game. She achieved further fame when she sang with Kirk Franklin.

Since 2012, Sohyang has participated multiple times on various television music competition programs Immortal Songs 2, King of Mask Singer, and I Am a Singer 2, winning twice on Immortal Songs 2 with songs "Lean on Me" and "Bridge over Troubled Water", and setting up a new record on King of Mask Singer.

After winning the Michael Bolton special episode on Immortal Songs 2 with a score of 442 points (fifth-highest ever), Michael Bolton—who described Sohyang as a "virtuoso"—asked Sohyang to tour South Korea with him, and they performed many concerts together throughout the country. Furthermore, her performance of "Lean on Me" won an award at the 2015 Banff World Media Festival.

In 2016 Sohyang was awarded the Grand Prize of the Seoul Success Award in the Culture category. In Disney's movie Moana, Sohyang provided the singing voice of the protagonist in the Korean-dubbed version. Sohyang also gives lectures about singing and vocal technique at Baekseok University in Cheonan City.

In the first half of 2017, Sohyang appeared on MBC's King of Mask Singer as "Spirited Lady" for the show's 2nd anniversary and became the winner six consecutive times (Generation 53-58), making her the female singer with the highest number of consecutive wins ever achieved to that time (second highest overall) before losing her crown in July 2017 and departing from the show after appearing for 14 consecutive weeks. Sohyang sang the main OST, "Wind Song" (바람의 노래), which is a remake of Cho Yong-pil's original song, for the Drama Confession Couple (고백부부). This OST was at No. 1 on the charts on Melon (online music service) for several weeks and additionally won the 1st place on Music Bank on November 24 in 2017. She was given a special stage on which to perform the main OST "Wind Song" at the KBS Drama Awards on the last day of 2017. Sohyang performed at the MBC Entertainment Awards 2017 and was awarded the Special Prize in the Music Show category for her participation in King of Mask Singer. She became the King of the show with the highest number of consecutive wins ever achieved as a female contestant at that time.

During the 2018 Winter Olympics in Pyeongchang, ice dancer Yura Min and Alexander Gamelin performed to Sohyang's rendition of "Arirang Alone". Furthermore, during the opening ceremony of the 2018 Winter Paralympics in Pyeongchang Sohyang performed, together with Sumi Jo, the song "Here as One", which they both recorded specifically for this occasion.

Personal life 

Sohyang is a devout Christian. She first began singing in her local community, with no aspirations of pursuing a career as a professional singer. Sohyang's parents divorced when she was in her third year of high school. Due to this, Sohyang experienced great financial difficulties, and, according to her, was often very sad as a result. She has said that she used to listen to artists Mariah Carey, Whitney Houston, and Celine Dion often, whose music helped her to get through these difficult times. In 2017 she was quoted as having said that her favorite album is still Mariah Carey's Music Box. 

In 1998, at the age of twenty, Sohyang married Kim Hee-jun, the drummer of her band POS. Soon afterwards she was diagnosed with uterine cancer; due to the early detection, she was able to survive the cancer, but was rendered infertile. Her sister-in-law is the guitarist JinJoo Lee from DNCE.

Voice 
Sohyang's vocal type is a Full Lyric Soprano. Her showcased vocal range spans from D3 to A6 a total of three octaves, three notes and a semitone. According to Sohyang, the highest note she can sing is an E7. This means that she has an overall range of approximately four octaves and one semitone. However, this range hasn't been showcased to its fullest extent yet, as the highest note she has publicly showcased is A6. Her belting range/mixed voice extends up to a Soprano C (C6). She is known for her emotive and powerful vocals and meticulous control. Her vocals have been praised by various vocal coaches and singers like Seth Riggs and Michael Bolton.

Discography

POS albums 

Track listing

Track listing

Track listing

Track listing

Track listing

Track Listing

Singles

As lead artist

Collaborations

Soundtrack appearances

Filmography

Variety shows

I Am a Singer 2 

Sohyang achieved the highest average rank of every contestant on I Am a Singer 2 ever. Furthermore, she never placed outside of the Top 3 during the whole time she was present in the show.

Records and statistics

Immortal Songs 2

King of Mask Singer

Records and statistics 

Sohyang was the first female singer to ever achieve 6 consecutive victories at that time and therefore set a new record, which was later broken by Son Seung-yeon ("The East Invincibility"). Sohyang received an average of 65.96 votes out of 99 every round, which was ranked in Top 10 of highest average scores of all Mask Kings and Top 3 highest average score of all female Mask Kings for a period of time.

Awards

KBS's Music Bank

References 

1978 births
Living people
People from Gangwon Province, South Korea
South Korean sopranos
20th-century South Korean women singers
21st-century South Korean women singers
Gwangsan Kim clan